Yaroslav Alshevsky (born 9 May 1991) is a Russian professional ice hockey forward. He is currently playing with Neftyanik Almetievsk of the Supreme Hockey League (VHL). He is a teammate with his twin brother, Stanislav Alshevsky.

Alshevsky made his Kontinental Hockey League (KHL) debut playing with HC Neftekhimik Nizhnekamsk during the 2009–10 KHL season.

References

External links

1991 births
Living people
Admiral Vladivostok players
Ariada Volzhsk players
Competitors at the 2011 Winter Universiade
Dizel Penza players
HC Kunlun Red Star players
HC Neftekhimik Nizhnekamsk players
KRS Heilongjiang players
Neftyanik Almetyevsk players
People from Nizhnekamsk
Russian ice hockey forwards
Universiade medalists in ice hockey
Universiade gold medalists for Russia
Sportspeople from Tatarstan